Geoffrey I may refer to:

Geoffrey I, Count of Anjou  (died 987)
Geoffrey I, Duke of Brittany (980–1008) 
Geoffrey I of Provence (died between 1061 and 1063)
Geoffrey I of Conversano or Geoffrey the Elder (died September 1100)
Geoffrey I of Villehardouin (c. 1169–c. 1229)
Geoffrey I of Vianden (1273–1310)